Hello Elephant is a 1952 Italian comedy film directed by Gianni Franciolini.

Cast
 Vittorio De Sica: Carlo Caretti 
 María Mercader: Maria Caretti 
 Sabu: Sultan of Nagore 
 Nando Bruno: Mr Venturi, landlord

External links
 

1952 films
1950s Italian-language films
Films directed by Gianni Franciolini
Films with screenplays by Suso Cecchi d'Amico
Films with screenplays by Cesare Zavattini
Italian comedy films
1952 comedy films
Films scored by Alessandro Cicognini
Italian black-and-white films
1950s Italian films